The  Yorkshire Cup competition was a knock-out competition between (mainly professional) rugby league clubs from  the  county of Yorkshire. The actual area was at times increased to encompass other teams from  outside the  county such Mansfield, Coventry, this season's appearance of  Newcastle, and even last year's appearance of London (in the form of Acton & Willesden. The competition always took place early in the season, in the Autumn, with the final taking place in (or just before) December (The only exception to this was when disruption of the fixture list was caused during, and immediately after, the two World Wars)

1936 was the twenty-ninth occasion on which the  Yorkshire Cup competition had been held.

York won the trophy by beating Wakefield Trinity by the score of 9-2

The match was played at Headingley, Leeds, now in West Yorkshire. The attendance was 19,000 and receipts were £1,294

This was the York's second successive appearance in a Yorkshire Cup final, last year as defeated finalists. It was also the  third and last of York's  Yorkshire Cup winning appearances, although they would appear in the  finals twice more, on each occasion ending as defeated finalists

Background 

This season there were no junior/amateur clubs taking part, one  "leavers" with the  loss of Acton & Willesden and one new entrant in the  form of Newcastle. This resulted in the  total number of entries remaining the same as last season at sixteen.

This in turn resulted in no byes in the first round.

Competition and results

Round 1 
Involved  8 matches (with no byes) and 16 clubs

Round 1 - replays  
Involved  1 match and 2 clubs

Round 2 – quarterfinals 
Involved 4 matches and 8 clubs

Round 3 – semifinals  
Involved 2 matches and 4 clubs

Final

Teams and scorers 

Scoring - Try = three (3) points - Goal = two (2) points - Drop goal = two (2) points

The road to success

Notes and comments 
1 * Newcastle's first Yorkshire Cup match. According to "The Grounds of Rugby League", Newcastle RLFC played at Brough Park in the 1936/37 season. For 1937/38 the team moved to the new White City Stadium in Gateshead.

2 * The receipts are given as £1,294 by the  Rothmans Rugby League Yearbook of 1991-92 and 1990-91 but as £1 less as £1,293 by "100 Years of Rugby. The History of Wakefield Trinity 1873-1973" 

3 * Headingley, Leeds, is the home ground of Leeds RLFC with a capacity of 21,000. The record attendance was  40,175 for a league match between Leeds and Bradford Northern on 21 May 1947.

See also 
1936–37 Northern Rugby Football League season
Rugby league county cups

References

External links
Saints Heritage Society
1896–97 Northern Rugby Football Union season at wigan.rlfans.com
Hull&Proud Fixtures & Results 1896/1897
Widnes Vikings - One team, one passion Season In Review - 1896-97
The Northern Union at warringtonwolves.org

1936 in English rugby league
RFL Yorkshire Cup